Shadow of the Boomerang is a 1960 Australian drama film directed by Dick Ross and written by Dick Ross and John Ford. It was a 'Christian Western' about a cattle station manager who learns to overcome his prejudice against aboriginals.

Plot
An American brother and sister, Bob and Kathy Prince, have come to Australia to manage a cattle station owned by their father Bob. Bob is prejudiced against aboriginals. He refuses to let stockman Johnny attend Billy Graham's 1959 crusade of Australia. However Johnny is fatally gored to death after saving Bob from being attacked by a boar. Bob overcomes his prejudice.

Cast
 Georgia Lee – Kathy Prince
 Dickie Jones – Bob Prince
 Jimmy Little – Johnny
 Marcia Hathaway – Penny
 Ken Frazer as stockman
Keith Buckley as stockman
 Vaughan Tracey – Dr Cornell
 Billy Graham – Himself
Hugh Sanders
Maurice Manson
Orville Sherman
Vicky Simms

Production
The film was inspired by Billy Graham's 1959 crusade and was made by World Wide Pictures, the film arm of the Billy Graham Evangelistic Association.

In October 1959, the American director, Dick Ross, and stars, arrived in Sydney. Ross co-wrote the script with Australian author John Ford. Filming started in November and mostly took place near Camden. The movie was made with funds raised during the crusade and took 25 days to shoot.

The film starred Marcia Hathaway, who was killed by a shark in 1963. She had become a born again Christian during Billy Graham's visit to Australia in 1959. She is the last person to date to be killed by a shark in Sydney Harbour.

Aboriginal singer Jimmy Little made his film debut in this movie.

References

External links
 
 Shadow of the Boomerang at Creative Spirits
Shadow of the Boomerang at TCMDB
Shadow of the Boomerang at Oz Movies

1960 films
1960 Western (genre) films
Australian Western (genre) films
1960 drama films
Films directed by Dick Ross (director)
Australian drama films
1960s English-language films